The San Diego State Aztecs men's soccer team is a varsity intercollegiate athletic team of San Diego State University in San Diego, California, United States. The team is an associate member of the Pac-12 Conference, which is part of the National Collegiate Athletic Association's Division I. The team plays its home games at SDSU Sports Deck in San Diego. The Aztecs are coached by Ryan Hopkins.

Coaching history 
As of the 2019 Media Guide

Through January 21, 2020.

Statistical leaders

Top goalscorers

Assists leaders

Postseason

The San Diego State Aztecs have an NCAA Division I Men's Soccer Tournament record of 5–8 through eight appearances. The Aztecs also reached the tournament in 1981, though the result was vacated by the NCAA after it was revealed that the team fielded an ineligible player during the tournament.

Aztecs in Major League Soccer
 Daniel Steres (born 1990), professional soccer player with the LA Galaxy

References

External links 
 

 
1968 establishments in California
Association football clubs established in 1968